The Best of Irving Berlin's Songs from Mr. President is a 1962 album by Perry Como, his tenth RCA Victor 12" long-play album.

In this album, Como performs select songs from Irving Berlin's then new (and final) Broadway musical, Mr. President. Perry is joined by members of his Kraft Music Hall TV family, Kaye Ballard, Sandy Stewart and the Ray Charles Singers.

Track listing
Side one
Opening
"It Gets Lonely in the White House"
"The First Lady"
"In Our Hide-Away"
"The Secret Service"
"Pigtails & Freckles"
"Is He the Only Man in the World?"
    
Side two
"Is She the Only Girl in the World?"
"They Love Me"
"I'm Gonna Get Him"
"Glad to Be Home"
"Song for Belly Dancer"
"Empty Pockets Filled With Love"
Finale: "This Is a Great Country"

All words and music by Irving Berlin.

References

External links
Perry Como Discography

Perry Como albums
Albums produced by Hugo & Luigi
1962 compilation albums
RCA Victor compilation albums
Irving Berlin tribute albums